Novoselki is the name of several  rural localities in Russia.

Bryansk Oblast
As of 2010, one rural locality in Bryansk Oblast bears this name:
Novoselki, Bryansk Oblast, a selo in Novoselsky Selsoviet of Bryansky District

Ivanovo Oblast
As of 2010, three rural localities in Ivanovo Oblast bear this name:
Novoselki, Komsomolsky District, Ivanovo Oblast, a selo in Komsomolsky District
Novoselki, Palekhsky District, Ivanovo Oblast, a village in Palekhsky District
Novoselki, Yuryevetsky District, Ivanovo Oblast, a village in Yuryevetsky District

Kaliningrad Oblast
As of 2010, two rural localities in Kaliningrad Oblast bear this name:
Novoselki, Bagrationovsky District, Kaliningrad Oblast, a settlement in Gvardeysky Rural Okrug of Bagrationovsky District
Novoselki, Pravdinsky District, Kaliningrad Oblast, a settlement under the administrative jurisdiction of the urban-type settlement of district significance of Zheleznodorozhny, Pravdinsky District

Kaluga Oblast
As of 2010, fifteen rural localities in Kaluga Oblast bear this name:
Novoselki, Kaluga, Kaluga Oblast, a village under the administrative jurisdiction of the City of Kaluga
Novoselki, Baryatinsky District, Kaluga Oblast, a village in Baryatinsky District
Novoselki, Ferzikovsky District, Kaluga Oblast, a village in Ferzikovsky District
Novoselki, Khvastovichsky District, Kaluga Oblast, a village in Khvastovichsky District
Novoselki, Kirovsky District, Kaluga Oblast, a village in Kirovsky District
Novoselki (Popelevo Rural Settlement), Kozelsky District, Kaluga Oblast, a village in Kozelsky District; municipally, a part of Popelevo Rural Settlement of that district
Novoselki (Lavrovsk Rural Settlement), Kozelsky District, Kaluga Oblast, a village in Kozelsky District; municipally, a part of Lavrovsk Rural Settlement of that district
Novoselki, Maloyaroslavetsky District, Kaluga Oblast, a village in Maloyaroslavetsky District
Novoselki, Medynsky District, Kaluga Oblast, a village in Medynsky District
Novoselki (selo), Meshchovsky District, Kaluga Oblast, a selo in Meshchovsky District
Novoselki (village), Meshchovsky District, Kaluga Oblast, a village in Meshchovsky District
Novoselki, Mosalsky District, Kaluga Oblast, a village in Mosalsky District
Novoselki (Silkovo Rural Settlement), Peremyshlsky District, Kaluga Oblast, a village in Peremyshlsky District; municipally, a part of Silkovo Rural Settlement of that district
Novoselki (Makarovo Rural Settlement), Peremyshlsky District, Kaluga Oblast, a village in Peremyshlsky District; municipally, a part of Makarovo Rural Settlement of that district
Novoselki, Zhukovsky District, Kaluga Oblast, a village in Zhukovsky District

Kostroma Oblast
As of 2010, seven rural localities in Kostroma Oblast bear this name:
Novoselki, Buysky District, Kostroma Oblast, two villages in Tsentralnoye Settlement of Buysky District
Novoselki, Kadyysky District, Kostroma Oblast, a khutor in Yekaterinkinskoye Settlement of Kadyysky District
Novoselki, Kologrivsky District, Kostroma Oblast, a village in Ilyinskoye Settlement of Kologrivsky District
Novoselki, Makaryevsky District, Kostroma Oblast, a village in Krasnogorskoye Settlement of Makaryevsky District
Novoselki, Ostrovsky District, Kostroma Oblast, a village in Klevantsovskoye Settlement of Ostrovsky District
Novoselki, Susaninsky District, Kostroma Oblast, a village in Chentsovskoye Settlement of Susaninsky District

Kursk Oblast
As of 2010, one rural locality in Kursk Oblast bears this name:
Novoselki, Kursk Oblast, a village in Yasenetsky Selsoviet of Fatezhsky District

Leningrad Oblast
As of 2010, two rural localities in Leningrad Oblast bear this name:
Novoselki, Kingiseppsky District, Leningrad Oblast, a village in Opolyevskoye Settlement Municipal Formation of Kingiseppsky District
Novoselki, Lomonosovsky District, Leningrad Oblast, a village in Koporskoye Settlement Municipal Formation of Lomonosovsky District

Lipetsk Oblast
As of 2010, three rural localities in Lipetsk Oblast bear this name:
Novoselki, Lukyanovsky Selsoviet, Stanovlyansky District, Lipetsk Oblast, a village in Lukyanovsky Selsoviet of Stanovlyansky District
Novoselki, Ostrovsky Selsoviet, Stanovlyansky District, Lipetsk Oblast, a village in Ostrovsky Selsoviet of Stanovlyansky District
Novoselki, Volovsky District, Lipetsk Oblast, a village in Ozhoginsky Selsoviet of Volovsky District

Republic of Mordovia
As of 2010, one rural locality in the Republic of Mordovia bears this name:
Novoselki, Republic of Mordovia, a selo in Michurinsky Selsoviet of Chamzinsky District

Moscow Oblast
As of 2010, twenty rural localities in Moscow Oblast bear this name:
Novoselki, Chekhovsky District, Moscow Oblast, a selo in Barantsevskoye Rural Settlement of Chekhovsky District
Novoselki, Dmitrovsky District, Moscow Oblast, a village in Sinkovskoye Rural Settlement of Dmitrovsky District
Novoselki, Kashirsky District, Moscow Oblast, a settlement in Znamenskoye Rural Settlement of Kashirsky District
Novoselki, Klinsky District, Moscow Oblast, a village in Vozdvizhenskoye Rural Settlement of Klinsky District
Novoselki, Biorkovskoye Rural Settlement, Kolomensky District, Moscow Oblast, a village in Biorkovskoye Rural Settlement of Kolomensky District
Novoselki, Khoroshovskoye Rural Settlement, Kolomensky District, Moscow Oblast, a village in Khoroshovskoye Rural Settlement of Kolomensky District
Novoselki, Mozhaysky District, Moscow Oblast, a village in Klementyevskoye Rural Settlement of Mozhaysky District
Novoselki, Naro-Fominsky District, Moscow Oblast, a village in Ateptsevskoye Rural Settlement of Naro-Fominsky District
Novoselki, Podolsky District, Moscow Oblast, a village in Lagovskoye Rural Settlement of Podolsky District
Novoselki, Serebryano-Prudsky District, Moscow Oblast, a village in Uzunovskoye Rural Settlement of Serebryano-Prudsky District
Novoselki, Lozovskoye Rural Settlement, Sergiyevo-Posadsky District, Moscow Oblast, a village in Lozovskoye Rural Settlement of Sergiyevo-Posadsky District
Novoselki, Selkovskoye Rural Settlement, Sergiyevo-Posadsky District, Moscow Oblast, a village in Selkovskoye Rural Settlement of Sergiyevo-Posadsky District
Novoselki, Shemetovskoye Rural Settlement, Sergiyevo-Posadsky District, Moscow Oblast, a village in Shemetovskoye Rural Settlement of Sergiyevo-Posadsky District
Novoselki, Khotkovo, Sergiyevo-Posadsky District, Moscow Oblast, a village under the administrative jurisdiction of the Town of Khotkovo in Sergiyevo-Posadsky District
Novoselki, Dashkovskoye Rural Settlement, Serpukhovsky District, Moscow Oblast, a village in Dashkovskoye Rural Settlement of Serpukhovsky District
Novoselki, Lipitskoye Rural Settlement, Serpukhovsky District, Moscow Oblast, a village in Lipitskoye Rural Settlement of Serpukhovsky District
Novoselki, Aksinyinskoye Rural Settlement, Stupinsky District, Moscow Oblast, a village in Aksinyinskoye Rural Settlement of Stupinsky District
Novoselki, Leontyevskoye Rural Settlement, Stupinsky District, Moscow Oblast, a village in Leontyevskoye Rural Settlement of Stupinsky District
Novoselki, Zhilyovo, Stupinsky District, Moscow Oblast, a village under the administrative jurisdiction of the work settlement of Zhilyovo in Stupinsky District
Novoselki, Zaraysky District, Moscow Oblast, a village in Gololobovskoye Rural Settlement of Zaraysky District

Nizhny Novgorod Oblast
As of 2010, six rural localities in Nizhny Novgorod Oblast bear this name:
Novoselki, Arzamassky District, Nizhny Novgorod Oblast, a selo in Bebyayevsky Selsoviet of Arzamassky District
Novoselki, Lukoyanovsky District, Nizhny Novgorod Oblast, a selo in Bolshearsky Selsoviet of Lukoyanovsky District
Novoselki, Sechenovsky District, Nizhny Novgorod Oblast, a village in Vasilyevsky Selsoviet of Sechenovsky District
Novoselki, Vachsky District, Nizhny Novgorod Oblast, a selo in Novoselsky Selsoviet of Vachsky District
Novoselki, Vadsky District, Nizhny Novgorod Oblast, a village in Kruto-Maydansky Selsoviet of Vadsky District
Novoselki, Voznesensky District, Nizhny Novgorod Oblast, a selo in Butakovsky Selsoviet of Voznesensky District

Novgorod Oblast
As of 2010, two rural localities in Novgorod Oblast bear this name:
Novoselki, Kholmsky District, Novgorod Oblast, a village in Morkhovskoye Settlement of Kholmsky District
Novoselki, Pestovsky District, Novgorod Oblast, a village in Pestovskoye Settlement of Pestovsky District

Orenburg Oblast
As of 2010, one rural locality in Orenburg Oblast bears this name:
Novoselki, Orenburg Oblast, a selo in Vasilyevsky Selsoviet of Saraktashsky District

Oryol Oblast
As of 2010, six rural localities in Oryol Oblast bear this name:
Novoselki, Dmitrovsky District, Oryol Oblast, a settlement in Berezovsky Selsoviet of Dmitrovsky District
Novoselki, Kolpnyansky District, Oryol Oblast, a village in Belokolodezsky Selsoviet of Kolpnyansky District
Novoselki, Alyabyevsky Selsoviet, Mtsensky District, Oryol Oblast, a village in Alyabyevsky Selsoviet of Mtsensky District
Novoselki, Chakhinsky Selsoviet, Mtsensky District, Oryol Oblast, a village in Chakhinsky Selsoviet of Mtsensky District
Novoselki, Shablykinsky District, Oryol Oblast, a village in Kosulichesky Selsoviet of Shablykinsky District
Novoselki, Soskovsky District, Oryol Oblast, a settlement in Ryzhkovsky Selsoviet of Soskovsky District

Pskov Oblast
As of 2010, two rural localities in Pskov Oblast bear this name:
Novoselki, Novosokolnichesky District, Pskov Oblast, a village in Novosokolnichesky District
Novoselki, Velikoluksky District, Pskov Oblast, a village in Velikoluksky District

Ryazan Oblast
As of 2010, six rural localities in Ryazan Oblast bear this name:
Novoselki, Kadomsky District, Ryazan Oblast, a selo in Novoselsky Rural Okrug of Kadomsky District
Novoselki, Klepikovsky District, Ryazan Oblast, a village in Aristovsky Rural Okrug of Klepikovsky District
Novoselki, Ryazansky District, Ryazan Oblast, a settlement in Novoselkovsky Rural Okrug of Ryazansky District
Novoselki, Rybnovsky District, Ryazan Oblast, a selo in Novoselsky Rural Okrug of Rybnovsky District
Novoselki, Shatsky District, Ryazan Oblast, a selo in Kuplinsky Rural Okrug of Shatsky District
Novoselki, Starozhilovsky District, Ryazan Oblast, a village under the administrative jurisdiction of the work settlement of Starozhilovo in Starozhilovsky District

Samara Oblast
As of 2010, one rural locality in Samara Oblast bears this name:
Novoselki, Samara Oblast, a village in Syzransky District

Smolensk Oblast
As of 2010, ten rural localities in Smolensk Oblast bear this name:
Novoselki, Dukhovshchinsky District, Smolensk Oblast, a village in Babinskoye Rural Settlement of Dukhovshchinsky District
Novoselki, Krasninsky District, Smolensk Oblast, a village in Mankovskoye Rural Settlement of Krasninsky District
Novoselki, Gryazenyatskoye Rural Settlement, Roslavlsky District, Smolensk Oblast, a village in Gryazenyatskoye Rural Settlement of Roslavlsky District
Novoselki, Syrokorenskoye Rural Settlement, Roslavlsky District, Smolensk Oblast, a village in Syrokorenskoye Rural Settlement of Roslavlsky District
Novoselki, Rudnyansky District, Smolensk Oblast, a village in Klyarinovskoye Rural Settlement of Rudnyansky District
Novoselki, Smetaninskoye Rural Settlement, Smolensky District, Smolensk Oblast, a village in Smetaninskoye Rural Settlement of Smolensky District
Novoselki, Stabenskoye Rural Settlement, Smolensky District, Smolensk Oblast, a village in Stabenskoye Rural Settlement of Smolensky District
Novoselki, Kalpitskoye Rural Settlement, Vyazemsky District, Smolensk Oblast, a village in Kalpitskoye Rural Settlement of Vyazemsky District
Novoselki, Polyanovskoye Rural Settlement, Vyazemsky District, Smolensk Oblast, a village in Polyanovskoye Rural Settlement of Vyazemsky District
Novoselki, Yartsevsky District, Smolensk Oblast, a village in Lvovskoye Rural Settlement of Yartsevsky District

Tambov Oblast
As of 2010, two rural localities in Tambov Oblast bear this name:
Novoselki, Michurinsky District, Tambov Oblast, a village in Starokazinsky Selsoviet of Michurinsky District
Novoselki, Nikiforovsky District, Tambov Oblast, a village in Yurlovsky Selsoviet of Nikiforovsky District

Republic of Tatarstan
As of 2010, one rural locality in the Republic of Tatarstan bears this name:
Novoselki, Republic of Tatarstan, a selo in Buinsky District

Tula Oblast
As of 2010, eleven rural localities in Tula Oblast bear this name:
Novoselki, Aleksinsky District, Tula Oblast, a village in Aleksandrovsky Rural Okrug of Aleksinsky District
Novoselki, Chernsky District, Tula Oblast, a village in Yerzhinskaya Rural Administration of Chernsky District
Novoselki, Kamensky District, Tula Oblast, a village in Galitsky Rural Okrug of Kamensky District
Novoselki, Kimovsky District, Tula Oblast, a village in Pronsky Rural Okrug of Kimovsky District
Novoselki, Leninsky District, Tula Oblast, a village in Bezhkovsky Rural Okrug of Leninsky District
Novoselki, Plavsky District, Tula Oblast, a settlement in Kamyninsky Rural Okrug of Plavsky District
Novoselki, Shchyokinsky District, Tula Oblast, a village in Kostomarovskaya Rural Administration of Shchyokinsky District
Novoselki, Tyoplo-Ogaryovsky District, Tula Oblast, a village in Naryshkinsky Rural Okrug of Tyoplo-Ogaryovsky District
Novoselki, Venyovsky District, Tula Oblast, a village in Anishinsky Rural Okrug of Venyovsky District
Novoselki, Yasnogorsky District, Tula Oblast, a settlement in Znamenskaya Rural Territory of Yasnogorsky District
Novoselki, Zaoksky District, Tula Oblast, a village in Malakhovsky Rural Okrug of Zaoksky District

Tver Oblast
As of 2010, six rural localities in Tver Oblast bear this name:
Novoselki, Andreapolsky District, Tver Oblast, a village in Andreapolsky District
Novoselki, Nelidovsky District, Tver Oblast, a village in Nelidovsky District
Novoselki, Oleninsky District, Tver Oblast, a village in Oleninsky District
Novoselki, Selizharovsky District, Tver Oblast, a village in Selizharovsky District
Novoselki, Zapadnodvinsky District, Tver Oblast, a village in Zapadnodvinsky District
Novoselki, Zharkovsky District, Tver Oblast, a settlement in Zharkovsky District

Tyumen Oblast
As of 2010, one rural locality in Tyumen Oblast bears this name:
Novoselki, Tyumen Oblast, a village in Beskozobovsky Rural Okrug of Golyshmanovsky District

Ulyanovsk Oblast
As of 2010, one rural locality in Ulyanovsk Oblast bears this name:
Novoselki, Ulyanovsk Oblast, a settlement in Novoselkinsky Rural Okrug of Melekessky District

Vladimir Oblast
As of 2010, one rural locality in Vladimir Oblast bears this name:
Novoselki, Vladimir Oblast, a village in Muromsky District

Vologda Oblast
As of 2010, one rural locality in Vologda Oblast bears this name:
Novoselki, Vologda Oblast, a village in Lyubomirovsky Selsoviet of Sheksninsky District

Voronezh Oblast
As of 2010, one rural locality in Voronezh Oblast bears this name:
Novoselki, Voronezh Oblast, a settlement in Khlebenskoye Rural Settlement of Novousmansky District

Yaroslavl Oblast
As of 2010, twelve rural localities in Yaroslavl Oblast bear this name:
Novoselki, Bolsheselsky District, Yaroslavl Oblast, a village in Markovsky Rural Okrug of Bolsheselsky District
Novoselki, Danilovsky District, Yaroslavl Oblast, a village in Ryzhikovsky Rural Okrug of Danilovsky District
Novoselki, Gavrilov-Yamsky District, Yaroslavl Oblast, a village in Mitinsky Rural Okrug of Gavrilov-Yamsky District
Novoselki, Lyubimsky District, Yaroslavl Oblast, a village in Voskresensky Rural Okrug of Lyubimsky District
Novoselki, Myshkinsky District, Yaroslavl Oblast, a village in Arkhangelsky Rural Okrug of Myshkinsky District
Novoselki, Nekouzsky District, Yaroslavl Oblast, a village in Shestikhinsky Rural Okrug of Nekouzsky District
Novoselki, Nekrasovsky District, Yaroslavl Oblast, a village in Yakushevsky Rural Okrug of Nekrasovsky District
Novoselki, Rybinsky District, Yaroslavl Oblast, a village in Oktyabrsky Rural Okrug of Rybinsky District
Novoselki, Tutayevsky District, Yaroslavl Oblast, a village in Artemyevsky Rural Okrug of Tutayevsky District
Novoselki, Uglichsky District, Yaroslavl Oblast, a village in Maymersky Rural Okrug of Uglichsky District
Novoselki, Lyutovsky Rural Okrug, Yaroslavsky District, Yaroslavl Oblast, a village in Lyutovsky Rural Okrug of Yaroslavsky District
Novoselki, Mordvinovsky Rural Okrug, Yaroslavsky District, Yaroslavl Oblast, a village in Mordvinovsky Rural Okrug of Yaroslavsky District